Istoway, sometimes called Estovay or Istoi, is a village in Nimroz Province, in western Afghanistan.

References

Populated places in Nimruz Province